Tomb TT280, located in Sheikh Abd el-Qurna, part of the Theban Necropolis, is the burial place of the ancient Egyptian noble Meketre who was chancellor and chief steward during the reign of Mentuhotep II and Mentuhotep III, during the Eleventh Dynasty.

Discovery and excavation

The tomb was discovered in 1895 by Daressy. It had been plundered in ancient times, but when Winlock excavated it in 1920, an undisturbed room containing several models was discovered. These models cover daily life at the estate of the Vizier Meketre.

Models

This tomb contained many models:

 In the Cairo Museum: two canoes with draw-net, Boat with paddles, and Meketre and son Antef under canopy, sailing-boat with Meketre under canopy, Kitchen tender, Sailing-boat with wicker cabin, Sailing-boat, house in garden, Carpenter's shop, Spinning and weaving, Inspection of cattle, Female offering-bringer with drink.

 In the Metropolitan Museum of Art, New York: rowing-boat with musicians and kitchen tender, Rowing-boat, Sailing boat with Meketre and son Antef under canopy, Boat with paddles, Boat with paddles, men harpooning fish, and Meketre and son Antef seated on deck, Female offering-bringer with food, Four male and female offering bringers in procession, Cattle in stable, Slaughterhouse, Granary, Brewers and Bakers, House in garden.

See also
 List of Theban tombs

References

External links
(WayBack) Bibliography for TT 280:  Meketre—Theban Mapping Project

Buildings and structures of the Eleventh Dynasty of Egypt
Theban tombs